Luciana Ravizzi (born 1982) is an Argentine retired ballerina who graduated from The Royal Ballet School and was a Soloist with Scottish Ballet until her retirement in 2015.

Early life 
Luciana Ravizzi was born in 1982 in Buenos Aires, Argentina.  She began dancing at the age of five and was accepted into the Instituto Superior de Arte del Teatro Colón in 1994 at the age of 12.  In 1999, she auditioned for The Royal Ballet School, in London, where she gained acceptance and a scholarship to attend the Upper School. She graduated in 2002.

Dancing career 
While studying at The Royal Ballet School, Ravizzi was invited to perform with The Royal Ballet in several productions including "Giselle", "Swan Lake" & "Don Quixote", including an International tour on Australia in 2001.

Ravizzi joined the Scottish Ballet in 2002 under the directorship of Ashley Page, where she spent her entire professional career.  She was promoted to coryphée in 2008 and soloist in 2014.  During her time with Scottish Ballet she performed in the following ballets, including numerous international tours:

 The Nutcracker (Snowflake, Courgette Flower), Page
 Cinderella (Godmother, Winter), Page
 Fearful Symmetries, Page
 The Sleeping Beauty (The Lilac Fairy, Snow White), Page
 Pennies From Heaven, Page
 Cheating, Lying, Stealing, Page
 Alice (Duchess, Cheshire Cat), Page
 Dangerous Liaisons, Alston
 The Four Temperaments, Balanchine
 Apollo, Balanchine
 Episodes, Balanchine
 Rubies, Balanchine
 Agon, Balanchine
 Five Rückert Songs, Darrell
 Othello (Emilia), Darrell
 Artifact Suite, Forsythe
 Workwithinwork, Forsythe
 Petrushka, Spink
 Ride the Beast, Petronio
 Façade, Ashton
 Scènes de Ballet, Ashton
 Romeo & Juliet (Juliet), Pastor
 In Light and Shadow, Pastor
 Carmen (Mercedes), Alston
 Still Life, Caniparoli
 Song of the Earth, MacMillan
 Chasing Ghost, Loosmore
 Five Tangos, Van Manen
 Kings 2 Ends, Jorma Elo
 A Streetcar Named Desire (Blanche), Meckler/Lopez Ochoa
 Run For It, Lawrence
 Dark Full Ride, Lawrence
 Highland Fling, Bourne
 Oxymore, Laplane
 Elite Syncopations, MacMillan
 Cheri, Darrell
 Silhouette, Hampson
 The Rite of Spring, Hampson
 Hansel & Gretel, Hampson
 The Crucible, Pickett
 Ten Poems, Bruce

Ravizzi retired from dancing in 2015.

Teaching career 
Following her successful career as a ballerina, Ravizzi returned to Buenos Aires in 2017 to begin teaching the next generation of Argentine dancers.  She founded Luciana Ravizzi - Maestra de Danza and has since become a prominent teacher in Buenos Aires.  

In 2019, she moved to USA with her family where she continues to teach Ballet.  In 2022, she became a fully trained Pilates Instructor.

References 



Argentine ballerinas
Argentine dancers
Ballet teachers
1982 births
Living people